Three body may refer to:

Science
Three-body problem,  a problem in physics and classical mechanics
Euler's three-body problem, a problem in physics and astronomy
Three-body force, a force appearing in a three-body system

Science fiction
Three Body (science fiction), a science fiction novel trilogy by Liu Cixin
Three Body (film), an upcoming film based on the first novel, produced by Yoozoo Film, established by Lin Qi in 2014
Three-Body (TV series), a Chinese adaptation of the novel
The Three-Body Problem (upcoming TV series), an American adaptation of the novel

Eastern religions
Three Bodies Doctrine, doctrine in Vedanta: the gross body, the subtle body, and the causal body
Trikaya, the Buddhist Nirmāṇakāya or "created body", Sambhogakāya or "body of bliss", and the Dharmakāya or "Truth body"